Rambilli is a village and a Mandal in Anakapalli district in the state of Andhra Pradesh in India. There is a famous Lord Shiva Temple "Sri Dharalingeswara Swamy Temple" in Rambilli mandal at Panchadaarla (meaning five sacred water flows) in Dharapalem village It is also the site of INS Varsha, an upcoming Indian Navy base.

References 

Villages in Anakapalli district